Peter Ryan Boatman QPM (1953-2010) was a British former police officer who worked as a consultant to the Youth Justice Board, amongst others. He was found dead, in a suspected suicide, in his home on 1 October 2010.

His company, Pro-Tect Systems, was formerly the only authorised importer of Taser devices to Britain. The Sunday Times has claimed that he had a 50% stake in the company while creating the first British police training programme for their use. Their license was revoked as a result of irregularities found during the investigation into the death of Raoul Moat.

Boatman had previously been lampooned by comedian and activist Mark Thomas, who described how Pro-Tect had breached new UK controls on torture equipment and brokerage.

He was awarded the Queen's Police Medal in the 1998 New Year Honours.

References

British police officers
1953 births
2010 deaths
English recipients of the Queen's Police Medal